Herman Raymond Walston (November 2, 1914 – January 1, 2001) was an American actor and comedian, well known as the title character on My Favorite Martian. His other major film, television, and stage roles included Luther Billis (South Pacific), Mr. Applegate (Damn Yankees), Orville J. Spooner (Kiss Me, Stupid), J. J. Singleton (The Sting), Poopdeck Pappy (Popeye), Mr. Hand (Fast Times at Ridgemont High), Candy (Of Mice and Men), Glen Bateman (The Stand), and Judge Henry Bone (Picket Fences). He also played one of the miners in Paint Your Wagon (1969) with Lee Marvin and Clint Eastwood.

Early life
Walston was born on November 2, 1914, in Laurel, Mississippi, the second son and youngest of three children born to lumberjack Harry Norman Walston  and Mittie (née Kimball) Walston. He had an older sister, Carrie, and an older brother, Earl. His family moved from Mississippi to New Orleans, Louisiana, around 1925.

He started acting at an early age, beginning his tenure as a spear carrier rounding out productions at many New Orleans theaters. He mostly played small roles with stock companies, where he not only starred in traveling shows, but also worked at a movie theater, selling tickets and cleaning the stage floors. His family moved to Dallas, Texas, where he joined a repertory theater company under Margo Jones in 1938. He stayed at the Houston Civic Theater six years, "averaging 12 roles a year."

Career

Stage work
Walston was popular with Margo Jones' team of actors before he traveled to Cleveland, Ohio, where he spent three years with the Cleveland Play House. He then traveled to New York City, where he made his Broadway debut in a 1945 production of Maurice Evans's The G.I. Hamlet. Three years later, Walston became one of the first members admitted to the newly formed Actors Studio.

In 1949, he appeared in the short-lived play Mrs. Gibbons' Boys, directed by George Abbott, who later cast him as Satan (who bore the name "Mr. Applegate") in the 1955 musical Damn Yankees opposite Gwen Verdon as his sexy aide Lola. The chemistry between the two was such that they both garnered critical success and won awards for their roles. After a decade in New York theater, he won a Tony Award.

He starred as Luther Billis in the 1951 London production of South Pacific. He reprised that role in the 1958 film adaptation. He and Juanita Hall (as Bloody Mary) were the only cast members to appear in both the stage and movie versions. Additional Broadway credits included The Front Page, Summer and Smoke, Richard III, Wish You Were Here, and House of Flowers. In 1957, actress and producer Katharine Cornell placed him in a role on Broadway in Robert E. Sherwood's Pulitzer Prize winning play about the Hungarian Revolution of 1956, There Shall Be No Night. The play was adapted for television for a Hallmark Hall of Fame production. He had a prominent role in the Rodgers & Hammerstein musical Me and Juliet, portraying the stage manager of the musical-within-the-musical, but his character did not participate in any of the musical numbers.

Early film and television work
Walston reprised his role in the 1958 film version of Damn Yankees.  His other films included Kiss Them for Me; South Pacific; Say One for Me; Tall Story; Portrait in Black; The Apartment; Convicts 4; Wives and Lovers; Who's Minding the Store?; Kiss Me, Stupid; Caprice; Paint Your Wagon; The Sting; Silver Streak; and Get a Clue. Walston landed one of the three leading roles in Billy Wilder's comic farce Kiss Me, Stupid opposite Dean Martin and Kim Novak because, after six weeks of filming, Peter Sellers had to withdraw from the cast due to a heart attack.

He narrated many United States Department of Defense and Atomic Energy Commission (now United States Department of Energy) films about nuclear experiments, including the Operation Hardtack I nuclear test film series of 1958. He guest starred on numerous television programs, including The Shirley Temple Show, The Americans, and a television version of Going My Way.

My Favorite Martian

Walston achieved his greatest success as the title character (Uncle Martin) on My Favorite Martian from 1963 to 1966, alongside co-star Bill Bixby. The two immediately became close friends. The show was a top ten hit in its first season,still in the top 30 in its second, dropping to 45th in its third and final season. The success of My Favorite Martian typecast Walston and he had difficulty finding serious roles after the show's cancellation. He returned to character actor status in the 1970s and 1980s, and guest starred in such series as Custer, The Wild Wild West, Love, American Style, The Rookies, Mission: Impossible, Ellery Queen, The Six Million Dollar Man, Little House on the Prairie, and The Incredible Hulk, again with Bixby, in which Walston played Jasper the Magician in an episode called "My Favorite Magician".

Television comeback

From 1980 to 1992, Walston starred in 14 films, including Galaxy of Terror and Fast Times at Ridgemont High (as well as the 1986 television adaptation) as Mr. Hand. In a 1999 interview, Walston said that he was happy and relieved that when he walked down the street, young fans shouted at him "Mr. Hand" because he had finally torn away from his Martian role. In 1984, Walston played a judge on an episode of Night Court. Six years later, he made a guest appearance on an episode of L.A. Law. He later was hired for the role of Judge Henry Bone on Picket Fences; the character was originally a recurring role, but Walston proved to be so popular the character was later upgraded to a starring role.

In 1985, Walston made a brief appearance in the opening credits of Steven Spielberg's series Amazing Stories, as a caveman acting out a story for his tribe.

He appeared in Star Trek: The Next Generation as Boothby, head groundskeeper at Starfleet Academy in San Francisco, and reprised the role twice on Star Trek: Voyager.

In 1988, he guest starred in an episode of the popular horror-fantasy show Friday the 13th: the Series, as a bitter, elderly comic-book artist who uses a demonically cursed comic book to transform himself into a killer robot and murder his erstwhile enemies. In 1992, Walston played the role of Candy in the big-screen remake of John Steinbeck's Of Mice and Men with Gary Sinise and John Malkovich. He would work alongside Sinise again two years later in the miniseries adaptation of Stephen King's The Stand.

Walston received three Emmy Award nominations for Best Supporting Actor in a Drama Series for his work on Picket Fences, winning twice, in 1995 and 1996. CBS cancelled the show after four seasons in 1996. Walston made a guest appearance in an episode of Dr. Quinn, Medicine Woman entitled "Remember Me", in which he portrayed the father of Jake Slicker, who was stricken with Alzheimer's disease.

Later years
In 1994, Walston was diagnosed with lupus and as a result, his career began winding down. He appeared in an AT&T long distance TV commercial in 1995, in which his dialogue implied he was Uncle Martin from Mars, looking for good rates to talk to fellow Martians living in the United States.

Walston played Grandfather Walter Addams in Addams Family Reunion (1998). The next year, he appeared in the film remake of his hit series, My Favorite Martian (1999) in the role of Armitan. He appeared in the Touched by an Angel episode, "The Face on the Barroom Floor", which aired on October 15, 2000.

Walston made a cameo in the 7th Heaven episode, "One Hundred", which aired on January 29, 2001, four weeks after his death. His final film role was in the independent film Early Bird Special, which was released later that year.

Personal life and death
Walston married Ruth Calvert on November 3, 1943. The couple had one daughter, Katharine Ann.

Walston died on New Years’ Day 2001 at age 86 at his home in Beverly Hills, California

Partial filmography

 1957: Kiss Them for Me as Lt. (j.g.) McCann
 1958: South Pacific as Luther Billis
 1958: Damn Yankees! as Mr. Applegate
 1959: Say One for Me as Phil Stanley
 1960: Tall Story as Professor Leo Sullivan
 1960: The Apartment as Joe Dobisch
 1960: Portrait in Black as Cobb
 1961: The Americans as Whit Bristow
 1962: Convicts 4 as Iggy
 1963: Wives and Lovers as Wylie Driberg
 1963-66: My Favorite Martian (TV series) as The Martian
 1963: Who's Minding the Store? as Mr. Quimby
 1964: Kiss Me, Stupid as Orville J. Spooner
 1967: Caprice as Stuart Clancy
 1969: Paint Your Wagon as Mad Jack Duncan
 1970s: Math Country as Lionel Hardway
 1972: The Paul Lynde Show as Mr. Temura
 1972: Mission Impossible as Dr. Victor Flory
 1973: The Sting as J.J. Singleton
 1976: Silver Streak as Mr. Whiney
 1976: The Six Million Dollar Man as Horton Budge
 1977: The Happy Hooker Goes to Washington as Senator Sturges
 1978: The Love Boat as a cruise ship passenger
 1979: Institute for Revenge as Frank Anders
 1979: Buck Rogers in the 25th Century as Roderick Zale
 1979: Cliffhangers (11 episodes subtitled Stop Susan Williams) as Bob Richards
 1979: Starsky and Hutch (S4,Ep15) as Tommy Reese 
 1979: The Incredible Hulk (S3,Ep5) as Jasper the Magician
 1979: Little House on the Prairie (S6, Ep9 The King is Dead) as Jimmy Hart
 1980: Popeye as Poopdeck Pappy
 1981: Galaxy of Terror as Kore
 1982: O'Hara's Wife as Walter Tatum
 1982: Fast Times at Ridgemont High as Mr. Hand
 1982: Hart to Hart (TV series) as Elliott Laurence
 1983: Private School as Chauncey
 1984: Gimme a Break! as Andy
 1984: The Jerk, Too as Diesel
 1984: Santa Barbara as Mr. Bottoms
 1984: Night Court (TV series) as Judge Martin A. Landis
 1984: Johnny Dangerously as Vendor
 1985: Amazing Stories (TV series) 
 1985: O.C. and Stiggs as Gramps
 1985: Silver Spoons (TV series) as Uncle Harry 
 1985: Misfits of Science (TV series) as Barney 
 1986: The Mouse and the Motorcycle as Matt
 1986: Rad as Burton Timmer
 1987: From the Hip as 1st Judge
 1988: Friday the 13th: The Series (TV series) as Jay Star
 1988: Paramedics as Heart Attack Victim
 1988: Blood Relations as Charles McLeod
 1988: Saturday the 14th Strikes Back as Gramps Baxter
 1989: I Know My First Name Is Steven (TV movie) as Bob Augustine
 1989: A Man of Passion as Basilio
 1989: Oro Fino as Sacacorchos
 1990: Ski Patrol as Pops
 1990: L.A. Law as Gus Nivens
 1990: Angel of Death as Prison Librarian Jenkins
 1991: Blood Salvage as Mr. Stone
 1991: Popcorn as Dr. Mnesyne
 1991:	Dream On (TV Series) (Season 2 Episode 12: "The Charlotte Letter") as Father Augustine
 1991: Ralph S. Mouse as Matt
 1992: Star Trek: The Next Generation as Boothby
 1992: Eerie, Indiana (episode "The Loyal Order of Corn") as Ned
 1992: The Player as Ray Walston
 1992: Of Mice and Men as Candy
 1992: The Commish (Season 2 Episode 5: The Witches of Eastbridge) as Burt Hagstone
 1992: Space Case as Bert
 1992-96: Picket Fences (TV series) as Judge Henry Bone
 1994: The Stand as Glen Bateman
 1996: Project ALF as Motel Manager
 1996: House Arrest as Chief Rocco
 1997: Get a Clue as Sandy McSouthers, Barney Northrup, Julian R. Eastman and Sam Westing
 1998-99: Star Trek: Voyager (TV series) as a member of Species 8472 disguised as Boothby
 1998: Addams Family Reunion as Walter Addams
 1999: My Favorite Martian as Armitan
 1999: Swing Vote as Justice Clore Cawley
 2000: Touched By An Angel  (TV series) as Benjamin Clay
 2001: Early Bird Special as Pappy
 2001: 7th Heaven (TV series) as Sgt. Millard Holmes (final television appearance)

References

External links

 Ray Walston Papers at the Harry Ransom Center

 
 
 

1914 births
2001 deaths
American male film actors
American male stage actors
American male musical theatre actors
American male television actors
Outstanding Performance by a Supporting Actor in a Drama Series Primetime Emmy Award winners
Tony Award winners
Vee-Jay Records artists
Deaths from lupus
People from Laurel, Mississippi
Male actors from New Orleans
20th-century American singers
20th-century American male actors
20th-century American male singers
People with lupus